Benito di Paula, stage name of Uday Vellozo (born 28 November 1941), is a Brazilian singer-songwriter and pianist.

Life and career 
Benito di Paula was born in 1941, in Nova Friburgo. He started his career as a crooner at nightclubs in Rio de Janeiro and São Paulo. His first album was recorded by the label Copacabana in 1971. Di Paula's musical style became known as "samba-jóia", combining traditional samba with romantic and jazz  piano arrangements.

One of di Paula's hits was the 1974 single "Charlie Brown"; the song was covered by artists like Two Man Sound and Sylvia Vrethammar.

Discography 
 1971 – Benito di Paula (Copacabana)
 1972 – Ela (Copacabana)
 1973 – Um Novo Samba (Copacabana)
 1974 – Gravado ao Vivo (Copacabana)
 1975 – Benito di Paula e Seus Convidados - Brasil Som 75 (Copacabana)
 1975 – Benito di Paula (Copacabana)
 1976 – Benito di Paula (Copacabana)
 1977 – Benito di Paula / Assobiar ou Chupar Cana (Copacabana)
 1978 – Benito di Paula (Copacabana)
 1978 – Caprichos de La Vida Copacabana)
 1979 – Benito di Paula (Copacabana)
 1980 – Benito di Paula (Copacabana)
 1981 – Benito di Paula (WEA)
 1982 – Benito di Paula (WEA)
 1983 – Bom Mesmo É o Brasil (WEA)
 1984 – Que Brote Enfim o Rouxinol que Existe em Mim (RGE)
 1985 – Nação (RGE)
 1986 – Benito di Paula / Instrumental
 1987 – Quando a Festa Acabar (Copacabana)
 1990 – Fazendo Paixão (BMG Ariola)
 1992 – A Vida Me Faz Viver (Copacabana)
 1994 – Pode Acreditar (RGE)
 1996 – Baileiro (Paradoxx Music)
 1999 – Raízes do Samba
 2009 – Ao Vivo (CD e DVD, EMI Music)
 2016 - Essa Felicidade É Nossa (RYB8 Music)

References

Living people
1941 births
Brazilian pianists
Brazilian singer-songwriters
People from Nova Friburgo
21st-century pianists
Brazilian people of Romani descent